A constitutional referendum was held in the Comoros on 1 October 1978 following the overthrow of Ali Soilih on 13 May. The new constitution created a presidential and federal republic, granting each island its own legislature and control over taxes levied on individuals and businesses resident on the island, whilst reserving strong executive powers for the president. It also restored Islam as the state religion, while acknowledging the rights of those who did not observe the Muslim faith.

The new constitution was approved by 99.31% of voters.

Results

References

1978 referendums
1978
1978 in the Comoros
Constitutional referendums in the Comoros
1978